Eva Kaili (born 26 October 1978) is a Greek politician who has been a member of the European Parliament (MEP) since 2014. She served as one of fourteen vice presidents of the European Parliament from January 2022 until she was arrested in December 2022 and charged with corruption as part of the Qatar corruption scandal at the European Parliament. She was a Member of the Hellenic Parliament from 2007 to 2012 and, before her political career, was a news presenter for Greek television channel MEGA Channel from 2004 to 2007. Following her arrest on 9 December 2022, Kaili has been held in pre-trial detention in Brussels and, through her lawyers, has denied all charges against her.

Early life and education
Kaili was born in October 1978 in Thessaloniki to parents Maria Ignatiadou and Alexandros Kailis. She has a younger sister, Mantalena, who is CEO of ELONTech, an organisation aligned to Kaili's parliamentary work on emerging technologies.

Kaili studied architecture and civil engineering at the Aristotle University of Thessaloniki. She continued her studies at the University of Piraeus where she obtained a Master of Arts degree in international and European affairs in 2008.

Career
Before her political career, Kaili was a newscaster at Mega Channel from 2004 until 2007.

In 1992, Kaili joined the PASOK Youth. In 2001, she was President of the School of Architecture Students' Association and by 2002, she was already the youngest member to be elected to the Thessaloniki City Council.

Member of the Hellenic Parliament

In the 2004 national elections, Kaili was the youngest candidate standing. In the 2007 national elections, she was elected as a member of the Hellenic Parliament for the first district of Thessaloniki. At the time, she was the youngest Member of Parliament with the PASOK party. She retained her seat in the 2009 national elections until 2012.

During her term in Parliament, Kaili served as a member of the following Parliamentary Committees: Standing Committee on Cultural and Educational Affairs, Standing Committee on National Defense and Foreign Affairs, and Special Permanent Committee of Greeks Abroad. She was also a member of the Greek delegation to the Parliamentary Assembly of the Organization of the Black Sea Economic Cooperation (BSEC), the NATO Parliamentary Assembly, and the Parliamentary Assembly of the Union for the Mediterranean.

Ahead of a crucial vote of confidence for Prime Minister, George Papandreou in November 2011, Kaili made headlines when she announced that she would refuse to support the government in the vote; this would have left Papandreou with the support of just 151 PASOK deputies out of 300. She later backtracked and Papandreou won the vote of confidence with all 155 lawmakers of PASOK expressing their support for his beleaguered government.

Member of the European Parliament
Eva Kaili has been Member of the European Parliament since 2014 and was a member of the Progressive Alliance of Socialists and Democrats (S&D) group until her expulsion in 2022. Kaili now sits as an independent. She is Vice President for Innovation Strategy, ICT, Technology, Foresight, Businesses, ESG and CSR, UN, WTO, OECD and the Middle East. She was the first woman to Chair of the European Parliament's Science and Technology Options Assessment body (STOA) 2017–2022. She was also Chair of the Centre for Artificial Intelligence (C4AI), and Chair of the Delegation for relations with the NATO Parliamentary Assembly (DNAT) 2014–2019. She has been serving on the Committee on Industry, Research and Energy (ITRE), the Committee on Economic and Monetary Affairs (ECON), and the Committee on Employment and Social Affairs (EMPL). She is an alternate member on the Committee on Budgets (BUDG) and on Delegation for relations with the Arabian Peninsula (DARP) and was also involved in the Commission investigating the spyware Pegasus (PEGA).

In addition to her committee assignments, Kaili is a member of the European Parliament Intergroup on Cancer, the European Parliament Intergroup on Disability, the Delegation to the EU-Russia Parliamentary Cooperation Committee (D-RU) and the Delegation for Relations with the United States of America (D-US).

She was the recipient of a 2018 MEP Award for New Technologies.

Kaili became one of fourteen vice presidents of the European Parliament on 18 January 2022 after being elected on the first round by 454 votes. She was suspended from her vice-presidential duties on 10 December.

Between 2019 and 2022, Kaili was the head of the Hellenic S&D delegation until her expulsion from the party.

On 13 December 2022, the European Parliament voted to remove Kaili from her position as one of their vice presidents, with 625 votes in favor of removal, one against, and two abstentions.

Arrest and corruption charges

On 9 December 2022, Kaili was arrested by Belgian Federal Police following an investigation into organized crime, corruption and money laundering tied to lobbying efforts in support of Qatar; because Kaili enjoyed parliamentary immunity, her arrest was not on the original planning of the operation launched by Belgian authorities that day, but developments during the day led investigating judge Michel Claise (overall head of the operation) to conclude that Kaili was caught in flagrante delicto. A suitcase of cash was found with her father upon his arrest, and bags of cash were found at her home. The same day she was suspended from both the Socialists and Democratic Group with which she sits in the European Parliament and her national party PASOK. As part of the investigation, Belgian Police raided 16 homes and detained at least four others including parliamentary assistant Francesco Giorgi (Kaili's life partner), former MEP Antonio Panzeri (for whom Giorgi had worked at parliament, and with whom he had founded the human rights NGO "Fight Impunity"), and Kaili's father, Alexandros Kailis, who was arrested outside the hotel where he was staying with a suitcase of cash. During the raids over €600,000 in cash was recovered by investigators.

The arrest of Alexandros Kailis outside his hotel with the suitcase of cash led investigating judge Michel Claise to conclude that this was a case of Eva Kaili being caught In flagrante delicto; a special police team of around a dozen officers, accompanied by judge Claise in person, then headed for the home of Kaili and arrested her. Kaili did not resist, but was visibly shaken and in a state of shock and confusion, crying; Claise interrogated her for more than five hours.

Kaili's lawyers, André Risopoulos and Michalis Dimitrakopoulos, have protested the actions of Belgian authorities as a gross overreach of judicial power. In an interview with Italian newspaper Corriere della Sera, Dimitrakopoulos said that Kaili's arrest and initial interrogations were problematic because she was in a state of shock, fear and confusion and that the Belgian authorities failed to provide her with a reliable French-language interpreter.

The lawyer further claimed that it was only after a week that Kaili could testify "in a calm environment", where she was "in good enough psychological condition to be fully aware of what she was saying", and that it was "the first time she had a good interpreter".

On 12 December 2022, the Greek Anti-Money Laundering Authority announced that it had frozen all assets of Kaili and her close family members. This included all bank accounts, safes, companies and other financial assets. Of particular interest to the authorities, according to the head of the Anti-Money Laundering Authority, is a newly established real estate company in the Athens district of Kolonaki.

The timing of the arrests coincided with the 2022 FIFA World Cup being hosted in Qatar. At the time, there was significant criticism of the hosts within the European Union, but during a speech at the European Parliament, Kaili praised the country's human rights record and criticised accusations of corruption made against Qatar.

On 5 January 2023, Kaili, from the cell where she is incarcerated in Haren Prison outside Brussels, accused the Belgian authorities of "inhuman" behavior towards her. Since the day of her arrest and subsequent incarceration, she has asked for permission to meet her 22-month old daughter in prison or, failing that, to see her via Skype. However, both requests were rejected; Kaili said: "I am being tortured, this is so unfair that I cannot stand it, and I am breaking down. What is the problem with my little girl, why are they keeping her away from me?".  The authorities responded by permitting Kaili to have a three-hour meeting with her 22-month-old daughter in prison on the afternoon of 6 January; this was the first time Kaili had seen her daughter since her arrest in December. Kaili's father, Alexandros Kailis, brought the child to Haren Prison.

Kaili's three co-defendants, Francesco Giorgi (Kaili's boyfriend), Antonio Panzeri (an Italian former MEP and former Chair of the European Parliament Human Rights Subcommittee), and Niccolò Figà-Talamanca (a lobbyist and NGO activist) are described as pleading guilty to charges of corruption and money-laundering.

Since her incarceration, Kaili is being monitored by Haren Prison's in-house psychologists. Kaili declined to exercise her right, under Belgian law, to meet with a psychologist; however, Haren Prison staff judged it necessary for her. The psychologists were also present during Kaili's meeting with her daughter. Kaili's lawyers claim that Belgian authorities themselves are to blame for any psychological harm done to Kaili, especially in her early interrogations which the lawyers contest as being legally problematic.

On 19 January 2023, a scheduled hearing of the Court of First Instance in Brussels rejected Kaili's application to be freed from pre-trial detention and be placed under alternative measures, such as an electronic bracelet. Michalis Dimitrakopoulos (Kaili's lawyer) said: "For 16 hours she was in a police cell, and not in the prison. ... She was refused a second blanket. They took her jacket. This is torture". "The light was on all the time. She couldn’t sleep." André Risopoulos (Kaili's Brussels-based lawyer) said that Kaili had been held in solitary confinement from 11 to 13 January 2023. In response to these statements by Kaili's lawyers, a spokesperson of the Belgian Federal Prosecutor's Office said: "I haven't heard anything about this in the file or at any other time".

A subsequent hearing on 16 February 2023 again rejected Kaili's request to be freed or placed under alternative measures, and decided that she should remain in pre-trial detention. Kaili had changed her Belgian lawyer from André Risopoulo to Sven Mary some time before the hearing.

Controversies inside PASOK
Even before her arrest, Kaili was a controversial figure inside the Panhellenic Socialist Movement (PASOK), since she had regularly distanced herself from PASOK and adopted positions similar to those of Greek conservative parties. Following her arrest, PASOK president Nikos Androulakis described her as "a Trojan horse of New Democracy", and announced that she would not be a candidate for PASOK again.

In 2021 she was rumoured to plan a bid for the presidency of PASOK.

Personal life
Kaili and her partner Francesco Giorgi, a 35-year-old parliamentary assistant, have a daughter born in 2021.

Notes

References

External links
 
  
 
 Member profile on the website of the S&D parliamentary group

1978 births
Living people
Politicians from Thessaloniki
Mass media people from Thessaloniki
Greek television presenters
Greek television journalists
Greek women journalists
PASOK MEPs
Greek MPs 2007–2009
Greek MPs 2009–2012
MEPs for Greece 2014–2019
MEPs for Greece 2019–2024
MPs of Thessaloniki
Women television journalists
Greek women television presenters
Aristotle University of Thessaloniki alumni
20th-century Greek women
21st-century women MEPs for Greece